Qasımbeyli (also, Kasumbeyli and Kasymbeyli) is a village in the Agsu Rayon of Azerbaijan. The village forms part of the municipality of Ərəbmehdibəy.  Bu Kəndin əsasını Qasım bəy qoymuşdur. Kəndin adı bununla əlaqədardır. O əsasən Bərdəli olmuşdur.

References 

Populated places in Agsu District